David Gosset (born May 23, 1970) is a global affairs analyst, expert in international relations and sinologist.

Background 

David Gosset was born in Paris and mainly educated at the Sorbonne University in France.

He is known in China as 高大伟(pinyin : GAO DAWEI). He can lecture or write in French, English or Chinese.

Research orientation 
As a sinologist David Gosset writes on the Chinese world’s economic, socio-political, cultural, strategic transformation, its impact on 21st-century Asia and the global village.

He studies the notion of the "Chinese Renaissance". In his approach of China (中国 - ZHONG GUO) he insists on the importance of the notion of centrality 中-(ZHONG)："Zhong -- 中, or centrality -- is one of the most ancient and common Chinese characters and, in an analogy which sheds a light on China's global modus operandi, its polysemy in the Chinese historical and cultural context mirrors three important measures of centrality in the field of graph theory".

What he calls the "Xi Jinping Decade" is an important moment of the "Chinese Renaissance". The Chinese dream, a key element of the Xi Jinping Decade, is approached by Gosset in the following terms: "Concept and project, definition and positioning of a nation in a century of change, Xi Jinping's China Dream can be presented as a triptych, the visions of "Modern China," "Global China" and "Civilizational China."

Activities 

In 2001 David Gosset established the Academia Sinica Europaea at CEIBS (China Europe International Business School) and, one year later, he founded the Euro-China Forum, the oldest process of its kind. The 9th Euro-China Forum was organized with the UNESCO.

In order to study but also support the New Silk Road, he established the New Silk Road Initiative (NSRI) in January 2015.

In the framework of the New Silk Road Initiative he contributed as a curator and advisor to the major exhibition "From the Ancient to the New Silk Road" at the Presidential Palace of the Italian Republic.

From 2020, he started a series interviewing programs "A Time of Resilience" "A Time of Collaboration" with international politicians, scholars and experts, the directors of the programs are Lin Keyao and Jiaxing Liu.

In 2021, as the founder, he took the China-Europe-America Global Initiative, of which the C.E.A. Net-Zero Transition Platform gained recognition.

In 2022, he started C.E.A Think Tank Cooperation Forum. "A Special Roundtable on China and the World after the 20th Congress of the Communist Party of China (CPC)" was held on December 14 2022.

In 2022, The second dialogue of the China-Europe-America Net-Zero Transition Platform was held online on November 8 and 9. More than 40 speakers from 15 nationalities participated this event.

Honors 
David Gosset was awarded the "Cross of the Civil Order" in 2005 by the King of Spain, Juan Carlos I, for his work with the Academia Sinica Europaea He also received an honorary distinction from the Republic of Bulgaria for the establishment of the Euro-China Forum.

By a presidential decree on Dec 31 2014 he was nominated Knight of the Legion of Honor (Chevalier de la Légion d'honneur).

In September 2015 he received the Friendship Award from the Tianjin Municipality.

In June 2021, following the proposition of the President of the Council of Ministers of the Italian Republic, the Italian President Sergio Mattarella conferred to David Gosset the honor of Knight in the Order of Merit of the Italian Republic - Cavaliere Ordine al Merito della Republicca Italiana.

Publications

Book 
Limited Views on The Chinese Renaissance（《中华复兴管窥》）, Shanghai Translation Publishing House，September 2018
China and the World: The Long March Towards a Community of Shared Future for Mankind, edited by David Gosset, il Mulino Publishing House, 2020
Inspiring Tianjin, Tianjin Renmin Press, November 2020
China and the World: The Long March Towards a Community of Shared Future for Mankind, Volume 2 The Role of Business, Società editrice il Mulino, 2021
China and the World: The Long March Towards a Community of Shared Future for Mankind, Volume 3 Culture, Ideas and Arts, Società editrice il Mulino, December 2022

Articles 
 Xi-Trump meeting: practical step for China-US relations,The Telegraph, April 19, 2017
China and Africa on new silk roads, article in "Preview Policy Report for the 2018 Beijing FOCAC Summit ",Chinawatch, August 29, 2018
 Us Space Force a counterproductive reality, Chinawatch, August 17, 2018
 Chinese ‘Renaissance’ to a world of shared destiny, Chinawatch, June 22, 2018
 Vice-President Pence creates fallacious narratives,Chinawatch, October 5, 2018
Ordering disorder,Chinawatch, November 29, 2018
Sino-French relations help build global future, ChinaDaily, January 28, 2019
Sino-Western Diptych：Reflections on history, philosophy and art, Chinawatch, February 18, 2019
Europe-China Forum founder: Tianjin could be new century super-smart city, ChinaDaily, March 18, 2019
The EU and China as Co-architects of a "Smart BRI", Chinawatch, April 10, 2019
A clear call for HK's normal, Chinawatch, August 13, 2019
Jacques Chirac : A statesman's fight for human dignity, Chinawatch, September 27, 2019
Crisis won't disrupt China's renaissance, Chinadaily, February 6, 2020
The fog of sophism in a time of sinophobia, Chinadaily, February 19, 2020

References

External links 
 "A Community of Destiny For Mankind" David Gosset at Vision China, Hangzhou, on bilibili by Chinadaily, April 15, 2018
 David Gosset introduces the book China and the World at Uninettuno Talk, November 17, 2020
The Official Website of the China-Europe-America Global Initiative

Living people
1970 births